Wes Anderson is an American filmmaker who is known for his work in films, commercials, and short films. 
He has directed 10 feature films: Bottle Rocket (1996), Rushmore (1998), The Royal Tenenbaums (2001), The Life Aquatic with Steve Zissou (2004), The Darjeeling Limited (2007), Fantastic Mr. Fox (2009), Moonrise Kingdom (2012), The Grand Budapest Hotel (2014), Isle of Dogs (2018) and The French Dispatch (2021).

Filmography

Feature films

Short films

Commercials and promotions

Other work

Producer 
The Squid and the Whale (2005)

Executive producer 
She's Funny That Way (2014)
 Escapes (2017)

Acting credits

Reception 
Critical, public and commercial reception to Anderson's directorial features .

Frequent collaborators
Anderson's films feature many recurring actors, including Owen Wilson, Bill Murray (as of 2022 the most, with appearances in 9 of Anderson's films), Jason Schwartzman, Anjelica Huston, Adrien Brody, and Tilda Swinton. Below is a list of the recurring actors who appear in three or more of his films.

References 

American filmographies